Lophyra flexuosa is a species of tiger beetle in the genus Lophyra. It is a species capable of flying, like most Lophyra species.

References

Cicindelidae
Beetles described in 1787